The reigning champions Lisa Raymond and Samantha Stosur did not defend their title.

Cara Black and Liezel Huber won the tournament, by defeating Nuria Llagostera Vives and María José Martínez Sánchez in the final.

Seeds
The top 4 seeds received a bye into the second round.

Draw

Key
 WC = Wild card
 r = Retired
 w/o = Walkover

Finals

Top half

Bottom half

External links
 Official results archive (ITF)
 Official results archive (WTA)

Qatar Telecom German Open
2008 Women's Doubles